World Revolution may refer to one of the following:

World revolution, a Marxist concept of the overthrow of capitalism that would take place in all countries.
World Revolution, a song in the SNES game, Chrono Trigger
World Revolution (party), a British communist group.
World Revolution, a 1937 book by C. L. R. James
World Revolution through World Law, a book by Glen T. Martin
World Revolution, alternate name for Revolution, a political group
the "Occupy" protests